Chris McNally may refer to:

 Christopher McNally (born 1960), member of the Pennsylvania House of Representatives
 Chris McNally (actor) (born 1988), Canadian-born actor